Harrimanella is a genus of flowering plant in the heath family Ericaceae, with a single species, Harrimanella hypnoides, also known as moss bell heather or moss heather.   It was originally named Cassiope hypnoides by Linnaeus (1737) in his Flora Lapponica, but Harrimanella hypnoides is now the accepted name at Integrated Taxonomic Information System. The species name hypnoides means 'like Hypnum ', which is a genus mosses.

The plant is a cold hardy dicot perennial found growing on rock crevices in the Canadian arctic, Quebec, the Northeastern United States, Greenland, Iceland, the mountains of Norway, Sweden and Finland, Svalbard and arctic Russia, including the Ural mountains.

Harrimanella hypnoides produces moss-like cushions, about 5 cm high, often of prostrate stems with ascending shoot tips. The leaves are scale-like, looking like those of a moss. The flowers are conspicuous, white and bell shaped with five fused petals and five sepals. They are borne singly on short reddish pedicels. The fruit is an erect capsule.

References

External links

Ericaceae
Flora of Greenland
Flora of Eastern Canada
Flora of Northern Canada
Flora of the Northeastern United States
Threatened flora of the United States
Monotypic Ericaceae genera